Cotham Church is a Gothic Revival style church in Cotham, Bristol, England. Since 1975, it has been a Church of England parish church known as the Church of St Saviour with St Mary or simply as Cotham Parish Church.

History
Cotham Church was originally Highbury Congregational Chapel, built in 1842 and completed in 1843. The architect was William Butterfield and this was his first commission, obtained through his family's connection with William Day Wills of the tobacco firm W. D. & H. O. Wills.

The church's apse, tower, south transept and school were added in 1863 by Edward William Godwin. The large stone low in the enclosing wall along Cotham Road is part of Bewell's Cross, which marked the boundary of the city until the nineteenth century.

It has been designated by English Heritage as a Grade II* listed building.

Anglican church
In 1975, the Church of England purchased it. It is now known as the Church of St Saviour with St Mary or simply as Cotham Parish Church. The parish of "Cotham: St Saviour with St Mary" is part of a united benefice with St Paul's Church, Clifton, Bristol in the Archdeaconry of Bristol in the Diocese of Bristol. The church stands in the Liberal Catholic tradition of the Church of England.

See also

 Churches in Bristol
 Grade II* listed buildings in Bristol

References

Church of England church buildings in Bristol
Churches completed in 1843
19th-century Church of England church buildings
Grade II* listed churches in Bristol
William Butterfield buildings
1843 establishments in England
Highbury Congregational Chapel, Cotham